The Limitation Act 1623 (21 Jas 1 c 16), sometimes called the Statute of Limitations 1623, was an Act of the Parliament of England.

The whole Act was repealed by section 1(1) of, and Group 5 of Part I of Schedule 1 to, the Statute Law (Repeals) Act 1986.

Sections 1 and 2
These sections were repealed by section 1 of, and the Schedule to, the Statute Law Revision Act 1863.

Section 3

Amendments

The Limitation Act 1623 was amended by the Administration of Justice Act 1705 (4 & 5 Anne c 3), the Statute of Frauds Amendment Act 1828 (9 Geo 4 c 14) and the Mercantile Law Amendment Act 1856 (19 & 20 Vict c 97).

Period of limitation

By 1911, the period of limitation for most actions of tort and for all actions arising out of simple contract was six years from the accrual of the cause of action.

Actions to which the Limitation Act 1623 applied
General application

The Limitation Act 1623 applied to all actions to all actions arising out of simple contracts and to all actions of tort at common law except those actions for which there was a special period of limitation provided.

Particular instances of simple contract debts

The Limitation Act 1623 also applied to the personal remedy on a simple contract debt which was charged on land, where there was no convenient way to pay; to a simple contract debt which was recited in a deed, unless there was in the deed an express or implied contract to pay it; to a warrant of attorney to confess judgment for the amount of a simple contract debt; to an action for mesne profits; to an action against the equitable assignee of leaseholds in possession, grounded on his liability to perform the covenants in the lease; to a set-off or counterclaim; to an action founded on a foreign judgment; and to an Admiralty action for seamen's wages.

Actions given by statute

An action which a statute expressly enabled to be brought, but which was not an action for a statutory debt, was within the Limitation Act 1623. Thus, an action against a director of a company under section 84 of the Companies (Consolidation) Act 1908 (8 Edw 7 c 69) and the action referred to in section 26 of the Copyhold Act 1894 (57 & 58 Vict c 46) were, it seems, within the Limitation Act 1623, as was also a claim for indemnity under section 26 of the Land Transfer Act 1897 (60 & 61 Vict c 65)

The Limitation Act 1623 applied to a claim against an executor personally founded on a devastavit and to proceedings to enforce the statutory right which simple contract creditors had against the real estate of their deceased debtors.

See also
Limitation Act

References
Joseph Chitty. A Collection of Statutes of Practical Utility. First Edition. William Benning. 1829. Volume 1. Part 2. Pages 700 to 705.
Welsby and Beavan. Chitty's Collection of Statutes. Second Edition. 1853. Volume 3. Pages 57 to 62.
Lely. "Statute of Limitations, 1623". Chitty's Collection of Statutes of Practical Utility. Fourth Edition. 1880. Volume 4. Pages 85 to 92.
Lely. "The Limitation Act, 1623". The Statutes of Practical Utility. (Chitty's Statutes). Fifth Edition. 1895. Volume 6. Title "Limitation of Actions". Pages 3 to 9.
"The Limitation Act, 1623". Halsbury's Statutes of England. (The Complete Statutes of England). Butterworth & Company (Publishers) Limited. 1929. Volume 10. Page 429 to 432. See also the preliminary note at pages 426 to 428. See also pages 439, 440, 453, 456 to 460, 462 to 464, 471 and passim.
Henry Thomas Banning. A Concise Treatise on the Statute Law of the Limitation of Actions. Chapters 2, 3, 5, 6, 8 and 32 (which relate to the limitation of actions in simple contract and in tort under the Limitation Act 1623) and pages 3 and 79. See also passim.
Joseph Kinnicut Angell. A Treatise on the Limitations of Actions at Law and Suits in Equity.  1829. Pages vi, xix, xx, xxiii, xxv, 20, 25, 41, 45, 46, 48, 54, 58, 66, 68, 146, 162, 190, 197, 211, 215, 216, 218, 219, 226, 250, 291, 292, 296, 299, 300, 306, 308, 326, 331, 332, 340, 344, 346, 361, 367 and 381.
John Mason Lightwood. "Actions in Contract and Tort". The Time Limit on Actions: Being a Treatise on the Statute of Limitations and the Equitable Doctrine of Laches. Butterworth. 1909. Google. Chapter 4. Pages 191 to 250. See also passim.
George Barclay Mansel. "Personal Actions". A Treatise on the Law of Limitation. S Sweet. 1839. Chapter 3. Pages 22 to 35. See also pages 3, 45, 93, 96, 97, 105 to 108, 112, 113, 117, 127, 183 and 190.
Halsbury's Laws of England. First Edition. 1911. Volume 19. Pages 14, 37 to 42, 54 to 56, 58, 59, 67, 77 to 80, 82 to 84, 87, 88, 95, 97, 100, 105 to 107, 130, 138, 155, 157, 162, 165, 166, 168 to 172, 174, 175, 178, 182, 185, 186, 188, 192 and 393.
"Sect 2 - The Limitation Act, 1623". Halsbury's Laws of England. Second Edition. Butterworth & Co (Publishers) Ltd. 1936. Volume 20. Paragraph 749 et seq at page 597 et seq. See generally, pages 567, 595 to 603, 621, 622, 624, 625, 636, 646, 648 to 651, 654, 655, 657, 660 to 662, 670, 672, 673, 716, 717, 720, 740, 750, 759, 761, 762, 767 to 769, 771, 772, 780, 781 and 787.
The Laws of England. (Halsbury's Laws of England). Third Edition. Butterworth & Co (Publishers) Ltd. 1952. Volume 24. Pages 177, 188, 199, 210, 291 to 293, 304, 308 and 309.
Rowland Jay Browne. "Sect 6 - Personal Actions" in "Limitation of Actions". A Practical Treatise on Actions at Law. Henry Butterworth. 1843. Pages 59 to 93. See also pages 30, 31, 34, 57, 571 and 577.
"Developments in the Law: Statutes of Limitations" (1950) 63 Harvard Law Review 1177

Acts of the Parliament of England
1623 in law
1623 in England
Statutes of limitations